Last Hope may refer to:

Jūshinki Pandora, a Japanese anime series called Last Hope internationally
Last Hope (manga)
Last Hope (video game)
Last Hope (TV series), a Japanese-Chinese anime television series premiered in 2018
Last Hope, a television series with Mitsuki Tanimura
Last Hope (band), Kavarna Rock Fest, Bulgaria
"Last Hope", a song Paramore (album)
Última Esperanza Province, Last Hope Province
 The Last HOPE, a hacker conference H.O.P.E.
 Star Ocean: The Last Hope, a video game 
The Last Hope, a book in the Warriors novel series
 "The Last Hope", the twenty-sixth episode of Lego Ninjago: Masters of Spinjitzu